In mathematics, Steiner's problem (named after Jakob Steiner) may refer to:

Steiner's calculus problem
The Steiner tree problem
Steiner's conic problem